Ana Luisa Peluffo (born 9 October 1929) is a Mexican actress. She has appeared in more than 200 films and television shows since 1949. She starred in the 1977 film Paper Flowers, which was entered into the 28th Berlin International Film Festival.

Selected filmography

 Tarzan and the Mermaids (1948)
  La adúltera (1956)
 Las esclavas de Cártago (1956)
 La Diana Cazadora (1957)
 Ama a tu prójimo (1958)
 Las señoritas Vivanco (1959)
 Sed de amor (1959)
 To Each His Life (1960)
 The Phantom of the Operetta (1960)
 Las momias de Guanajuato (TV) (1962)
 Farewell to Marriage (1968)
 Vagabundo en la Lluvia (1968)
 El crepúsculo de un Dios (1969)
 Ángeles y Querubines (1972)
 La satánica (1973)  directed by Alfredo Crevenna
 Pobre Clara (TV) (1975)
 El valle de los miserables (1975)
 La venida del Rey Olmos (1975)
 La casta divina (1977)
 Paper Flowers (1977)
 Juana Iris (TV) (1985)
 Monte Calvario (TV) (1986)
 Pobre señorita Limantour (TV) (1987)
 El pecado de Oyuki (TV) (1988)
 Lo blanco y lo negro (TV) (1989)
 Entre la vida y la muerte (TV) (1993)
 Marimar (TV) (1994)
 Lazos de Amor (TV) (1995)
 Tú y Yo (TV) (1996)
 María Isabel (TV) (1997)
 Soñadoras (TV) (1998)
 Serafín (TV) (1999)
 Carita de ángel (TV) (2000)
 Contra viento y marea (TV) (2005)
 La virgen de la caridad del cobre (2008)
 Mujeres Asesinas (TV) (2010)
 Cartas a Elena (2011)

References

External links

1929 births
Living people
Golden Age of Mexican cinema
Mexican film actresses
Mexican telenovela actresses
20th-century Mexican actresses